Carmelina Moscato (born May 2, 1984) is a Canadian soccer coach and former professional player. She currently coaches Liga MX Femenil club Tigres UANL. She played as a centreback for UPC Tavagnacco in the Serie A, for Piteå IF and Dalsjöfors GoIF in the Damallsvenskan, for Chicago Red Stars, Boston Breakers and Seattle Reign FC in the NWSL, and for Western Sydney Wanderers in the Australian W-League. She also represented the Canadian women's national team. She served as the Commissioner of League1 Ontario Women's Division from September 2019 until December 2020. She also served as the Director of Women's Football for the Bahamas Football Association.

Early life
Born in Mississauga, Ontario, to Sicilian-born parents, Moscato began playing soccer at the age of four when she started playing for Dixie SC. She attended  St. Hilary Elementary School. For high school, She attended St. Francis Xavier Secondary School in Mississauga where she was named Most Valuable Player. She also played for the club team Burlington Flames.

College career 
Moscato attended Pennsylvania State University from 2002 to 2005 and helped the Nittany Lions win four Big Ten regular season championships. During her time at Penn State, the team earned appearances in the College Cup semifinals in 2002 and 2005.

Club career

From Canada to Italy and Sweden, 2005–2011 
Moscato joined the Vancouver Whitecaps in 2003 and played 256 minutes during her five appearances. In 2004, she helped the Whitecaps win their first W-League championship title. She scored three goals and three assists that season before joining Ottawa Fury in 2005. She sits 15th all-time amongst Whitecaps players after recording five goals and five assists in 14 appearances.

Moscato spent 2009 to 2010 with UPC Tavagnacco in the Serie A, the top division of soccer in Italy, before joining the national team camp to train heading into the 2011 FIFA Women's World Cup. She scored once in 15 league appearances playing as a defender. In July 2011, Moscato joined Canadian national teammates Melissa Tancredi and Stephanie Labbé to play for Piteå IF, a club in the Swedish Damallsvenskan. She started in all ten of her appearances with the club and scored one goal. She also made one appearance for Dalsjöfors GoIF in 2012.

NWSL, 2013–2015 
In 2013, she joined Chicago Red Stars for the inaugural season of the National Women's Soccer League (NWSL) as part of the NWSL Player Allocation. She made five appearances for the club. On June 29, 2013, it was announced that she had been traded to the Boston Breakers in exchange for her Canadian national teammate, Adriana Leon. She made five appearances for the Breakers during the remainder of the season. On September 10, 2013, she was traded to Seattle Reign FC in exchange for fellow Canadian national team player Kaylyn Kyle in preparation for the 2014 season.

International career 

At just 16 years of age, Moscato made her Canadian U-20 national team debut on February 6, 2001, during a 3–2 defeat against Finland at the Adidas Cup in Houston, Texas. She represented Canada during the country's hosting of the 2002 FIFA U-19 Women's World Championship, playing all six matches and helping Canada reach the final before losing to the United States.

On April 3, 2002, Moscato earned her first cap with Canada's senior team, playing 19 minutes in a 0–0 draw against Australia. Moscato has played in major tournaments such as the 2002 CONCACAF Women's Gold Cup, the 2003 FIFA Women's World Cup, and the CONCACAF Olympic qualifying tournament in 2004. After taking a two-year hiatus from the game, she returned to the international scene in 2009, and played for Canada during the 2011 FIFA Women's World Cup in Germany and the 2012 Summer Olympics in London. Some of her most notable successes with the team include winning the 2010 CONCACAF Tournament in Cancun, the Cyprus Cup in March 2011, and the bronze medal at the 2012 Olympic Games.

Coaching career
Moscato was an assistant coach at the University of Wisconsin. She used to be an assistant coach for the Louisville Cardinals.

In August 2016, Moscato coached Canada's women's under-15 squad to the second place in the 2016 CONCACAF Girls' U-15 Championship.

In 2017, she was the Talent Manager of the Canadian REX Development program before serving as an assistant coach with the Canadian women's U20 team from 2018 to 2020. In 2019, she served as the Technical Director for youth soccer team Kleinburg Nobleton SC.

Moscato became the head coach of the FC Nordsjælland women's team, a role she started in July 2021.

In June 2022, she was named Technical Director and head coach Liga MX Femenil club Tigres UANL becoming both the first woman and first foreigner to hold the role.

Administrative career
Moscato worked in Australia as Director and Coach of the Illawarra Stingrays Women's Senior Program for with the NSW NPL Domestic League.

In September 2019, Moscato was named as the Commissioner of League1 Ontario Women's Division. In December 2020, she left the position.

In February 2021, she was named as the Director of Women's Football for the Bahamas Football Association, but departed later that year.

Honours

Player 
Canada

 CONCACAF Women's Championship: 2010
 Summer Olympics: bronze medal: 2012
 Canada Soccer Hall of Fame, class of 2023

Manager 
Tigres UANL

 Liga MX Femenil: Apertura 2022

See also

 List of 2012 Summer Olympics medal winners
 List of Olympic medalists in football
 List of Pennsylvania State University Olympians

References

External links

 
 Chicago Red Stars player profile
 Boston Breakers player profile
 20 Questions with Carmelina Moscato
 

1984 births
Living people
2003 FIFA Women's World Cup players
2011 FIFA Women's World Cup players
2015 FIFA Women's World Cup players
Boston Breakers players
Canada women's international soccer players
Canadian people of Italian descent
Canadian people of Sicilian descent
Expatriate women's soccer players in Australia
Canadian expatriate sportspeople in Australia
Canadian expatriate sportspeople in the United States
Canadian women's soccer players
Chicago Red Stars players
Damallsvenskan players
Footballers at the 2012 Summer Olympics
Medalists at the 2012 Summer Olympics
National Women's Soccer League players
Olympic soccer players of Canada
Olympic medalists in football
Olympic bronze medalists for Canada
Penn State Nittany Lions women's soccer players
Piteå IF (women) players
OL Reign players
Soccer players from Mississauga
Western Sydney Wanderers FC (A-League Women) players
U.P.C. Tavagnacco players
Serie A (women's football) players
A-League Women players
Expatriate women's footballers in Italy
Women's association football defenders
Canadian women's soccer coaches
Female association football managers
Canadian expatriate soccer coaches
Canadian expatriate sportspeople in Mexico
Expatriate football managers in Mexico
Ottawa Fury (women) players
USL W-League (1995–2015) players
Vancouver Whitecaps FC (women) players